Octeville may refer to one of the following places in Normandy, France:

 Octeville, Manche, part of the reorganized port city Cherbourg-Octeville
 Octeville-l'Avenel, Manche
 Octeville-sur-Mer, Seine-Maritime